The 2015 NCAA Women's Gymnastics Championship was held at the Fort Worth Convention Center in Fort Worth, Texas, on April 17–19, 2015. Gymnasts from the six regional meets advanced to the NCAA Division I national team and individual competitions. The team competition was won by Florida Gators for the third time in their program's history.

Regional Championships 
The NCAA Regional Championships were held on Saturday, April 4, 2015 at the following six sites;

NCAA Women's Gymnastics Championship

Session One: Morning

References 

NCAA Women's Gymnastics championship
2015 in American sports
2015 in sports in Texas
2015 in gymnastics
NCAA Women's Gymnastics Championship
Sports competitions in Fort Worth, Texas